Tokić is a surname found in Bosnia and Herzegovina and Croatia.  People with the name include:
Bojan Tokić (born 1981), Slovenian table tennis player
Hrvoje Tokić (born 1990),  Croatian football forward
Mario Tokić (born 1975), former Croatian footballer
Niko Tokić (born 1988), Croatian professional footballer
Tin Tokić (born 1985), Italian-Croatian handballer

References

Croatian surnames
Serbian surnames
Bosnian surnames